Amateur Radio on the International Space Station (ARISS), operating in the Amateur-satellite service, is a project sponsored by various entities and carried out by astronauts and cosmonauts on the International Space Station who also have an amateur radio license. 

The program was previously called SAREX, the Space Amateur Radio Experiment, and before that the Shuttle Amateur Radio Experiment. In 2011, Kenwood Electronics launched an advertising campaign capitalizing on the fact that their TM-D700A transceiver is currently in use on the ISS.

Amateur radio operators all over the world are able to speak directly to astronauts/cosmonauts via their handheld, mobile, or home radio stations. Low power radios and small antennas can be used to establish communications.  

It is also possible to send digital data to the space station via laptop computers hooked up to the same radio and antenna, similar to an email communication, except that it uses radio frequencies instead of telephone or cable connections. 

This has been done by a YouTube channel known by the name "Retro Recipes" but instead of using a laptop he used a Commodore 64 along with a modem and a terminal. The experiment was successful and the international space station even broadcast the message back to earth.

The space station occupants work a standard work day and have breaks in the evening and during meals. While on break, some of them will spend some time communicating with "earthlings" via amateur radio.

Interoperable Radio System (IORS)
Interoperable Radio System (IORS) is the foundation element of the ARISS next-generation radio system on ISS. A total of four flight units and ten total units are being built by the ARISS hardware team. This first IORS radio was flown to ISS on SpaceX CRS-20 and installed in the ISS Columbus module by Expedition 63 Commander, Chris Cassidy on September 2, 2020. System activation was first observed at 01:02 UTC on September 2 by ARISS control station and amateur radio ground operators. Initial operation of the new radio system began as an FM cross band repeater.

A second flight unit is expected to be launched on a later 2020 cargo flight for installation in the Russian Service module.

The IORS will include a higher power radio, an enhanced voice repeater, updated digital packet radio (APRS) capabilities and slow scan television (SSTV) capabilities for both the US and Russian segments. The IORS consists of a special, modified JVCKenwood D710GA transceiver, an AMSAT-developed multi voltage power supply and interconnecting cables.

Future upgrades and enhancements to the next generation system are in various stages of design & development.  These include a repaired Ham Video system (currently planned for launch in mid-to-late 2020), L-band (uplink) repeater, ground command operations capability, LimeSDR signal reception, a microwave “Ham Communicator” and Lunar Gateway prototype experiment.

Notes

External links

 ARISS amateur radio website
 amateur radio operators ISS Fanclub
 Station to Saly : short documentary about an ARISS contact with French School in Senegal

Amateur radio organizations
Articles containing video clips